Gilad Bloom and Shahar Perkiss were the defending champions, but lost in the first round this year.

Roger Smith and Paul Wekesa won the title, defeating Patrick Baur and Alexander Mronz 6–3, 6–3 in the final.

Seeds

  Amos Mansdorf /  Christo van Rensburg (semifinals)
  Scott Davis /  Brad Gilbert (quarterfinals)
  Danilo Marcelino /  Mauro Menezes (first round)
  Patrick Baur /  Alexander Mronz (final)

Draw

Draw

External links
Draw

Doubles